Douglas Sydney Vernon (19 May 1905 – 26 March 1979) was an English amateur footballer who made five appearances for Southampton in the Football League in 1929. He also played for Wycombe Wanderers, with whom he won an FA Amateur Cup winner's medal in 1931.

Football career
Born in Devonport, Devon, Vernon was a leading aircraftsman with the Royal Air Force and represented them at football. In February 1929, he joined Southampton of the Football League Second Division.

Within days of being signed, he made his first-team debut when he took the place of the injured Willie Haines for the match at Oldham Athletic on 9 February 1929, which ended as a 3–1 defeat. Vernon retained his place for the next four matches without scoring before being replaced by Archie Waterston.

His Southampton career ended shortly afterwards when he was posted by the R.A.F. to the Far East. On his return from active service, he joined Wycombe Wanderers of the Isthmian League, although Southampton retained his Football League registration. During his one season at Wycombe, they finished third in the league but won the FA Amateur Cup, defeating Hayes 1–0 in the final, played at the Arsenal Stadium.

Vernon's club career ended at Leyton in the Athenian League.

Later career
After leaving the R.A.F., Vernon joined the Metropolitan Police, for whom he played football until the start of the Second World War.

Honours
Wycombe Wanderers
FA Amateur Cup winners: 1931

References

External links
Career details on www.11v11.com

1905 births
1979 deaths
Sportspeople from Devonport, Plymouth
English footballers
Association football forwards
Southampton F.C. players
Wycombe Wanderers F.C. players
Leyton F.C. players
English Football League players
20th-century Royal Air Force personnel
Royal Air Force airmen